Partisan is a 2015 Australian film directed by Ariel Kleiman. The film stars Vincent Cassel as Gregori, a cult leader. The feature marks Kleiman's directorial debut. Kleiman wrote the film with his girlfriend Sarah Cyngler. It premiered at the 2015 Sundance Film Festival.

Plot
Gregori, who operates as the patriarch to a "family" of child assassins, adopts Alexander after seeing his mother, Susanna, without a partner at a hospital. Eleven years later, Alexander is an adept assassin running missions with other future child assassins adopted in the same manner. Gregori tells the children the world is full of terrible men which is why they must carry out their missions. Gregori teaches the children to put earplugs in during assassinations to protect their ears from the gunshot.

Leo, Alexander's friend, is critical of himself after a mock assassination. Gregori sends Alexander and a girl on a mission where he kills a mechanic. Alexander sees his mother crying due to pregnancy, after she drops a piece of meat. He goes out during a mission and buys new meat at a local grocery store. The owner treats him kindly and gives him chocolate. Leo begins to question Gregori's authority escalating to a confrontation after Leo witnesses a chicken being slaughtered. He compares the chicken to the Tyrannosaurus rex, fearing its extinction. Leo disappears from the compound afterwards. Alexander begins to question everything he was taught. Susanna gives birth to a baby brother named Tobias. On Alexander's third mission he shoots a man and watches him bleed out. On his way back he meets a boy who plays with his gun before returning it to him. Alexander takes Tobias after coming home. He is confronted by Gregori as the camera pans down Alexander is seen holding his gun pointed at Gregori with earplugs in Tobias' ears.

Cast
Vincent Cassel as Gregori
Florence Mezzara as Susanna
Alex Balaganskiy as Leo
Jeremy Chabriel as Alexander
Samuel Eydlish as Ruben
Anastasia Prystay as Ariana
Alexander Kuzmenko as Ellis
Katalin Hegedus 
Rosa Voto as Leo's mother
Frank Moylan
Alexander Dahlberg as Nicholas
Oscar Dahlberg as Oscar
Wietse Cocu as Felix

Production
While most of the interior scenes were filmed in Kleiman's home country of Australia, the exterior shooting of the film was shot in Georgia in 2013 for five weeks.

The film's score was composed by electronic musician Oneohtrix Point Never.<ref>{{cite web |last=Stanley |first=Sean |url=http://diymag.com/2015/01/22/listen-to-oneohtrix-point-nevers-film-score-on-partisans-trailer |title=Listen to Oneohtrix Point Never's film score on 'Partisans trailer | DIY |publisher=Diymag.com |date=2015-01-22 |accessdate=2015-10-20}}</ref>

Reception
Critical response
On Rotten Tomatoes the film has a rating of 59%, based on 41 reviews, with an average rating of 5.8/10. The site's critical consensus reads, "Well-acted and suitably chilling, Partisan'' is a dark drama whose confident craft may offer enough for some viewers to look past its flaws." On Metacritic, the film received a rating of 50 out of 100, based on 12 critics, indicating "mixed or average reviews".

Accolades

References

External links

 (rating 2.5/5)

2015 films
Australian drama films
Films scored by Daniel Lopatin
2015 directorial debut films
2010s English-language films